Roger Mark Whiteside  (born 13 June 1958) is a British businessman, the former chief executive (CEO) of Greggs, the largest bakery chain in the United Kingdom.

Early life
He was born in Fulham. His father was in the British Army, and he moved to RAF Wildenrath in Germany. He returned to Southampton when he was 11 and attended Itchen Sixth Form College, then the University of Leeds, and gained a First Class degree in economics in 1979.

Career

Marks & Spencer
He joined Marks & Spencer in 1979, and worked with Sir Richard Greenbury, and helped to set up the Simply Food division. He became head of the food division at Marks & Spencer, .

Ocado
He helped to set up Ocado in 2000, with Tim Steiner, Jason Gissing and Jonathan Faiman. He was joint managing director with Nigel Robertson. Ocado sold products from Waitrose.

Thresher Group
He was Chief Executive at Thresher Group from 2004 to 2007. The company was placed into administration in September 2009.

Greggs
He became Chief Executive of Greggs on 4 February 2013.

Whiteside stepped down as Greggs CEO in May 2022. Animal rights charity People for the Ethical Treatment of Animals (PETA) honoured Whiteside's contribution to vegan foods, including the iconic Greggs Vegan Sausage Roll, by naming a rescued pig in his honour.

Personal life
He lives in Wargrave, in Berkshire. He is married with two children.

He was appointed an Officer of the Order of the British Empire (OBE) in the 2019 New Year Honours for services to Women and Equality.

References

1958 births
Alumni of the University of Leeds
British food industry businesspeople
British retail chief executives
British technology company founders
Living people
Marks & Spencer people
Officers of the Order of the British Empire
Businesspeople from Southampton
People from Wargrave